The 2021 Internationaux de Strasbourg was a professional tennis tournament played on outdoor clay courts in Strasbourg, France. It was the 35th edition of the tournament and part of the WTA 250 tournaments of the 2021 WTA Tour. It took place at the Tennis Club de Strasbourg between 23 and 29 May 2021.

Finals

Singles

  Barbora Krejčíková def.  Sorana Cîrstea 6–3, 6–3

Doubles

  Alexa Guarachi /  Desirae Krawczyk def.  Makoto Ninomiya /  Yang Zhaoxuan 6–2, 6–3

Singles main-draw entrants

Seeds

 Rankings are as of 17 May 2021.

Other entrants
The following players received wildcards into the singles main draw:
  Clara Burel
  Harmony Tan

The following players received entry from the qualifying draw:
  Océane Dodin
  Yuliya Hatouka
  Andrea Lázaro García
  Jule Niemeier
  Diane Parry
  Maryna Zanevska

Withdrawals
Before the tournament
  Danielle Collins → replaced by  Sorana Cîrstea
  Coco Gauff → replaced by  Misaki Doi
  Veronika Kudermetova → replaced by  Caroline Garcia
  Svetlana Kuznetsova → replaced by  Alison Van Uytvanck
  Anastasia Pavlyuchenkova → replaced by  Nao Hibino
  Nadia Podoroska → replaced by  Christina McHale
  Alison Riske → replaced by  Lauren Davis
  Elena Rybakina → replaced by  Zarina Diyas
  Sara Sorribes Tormo → replaced by  Rebecca Peterson
  Donna Vekić → replaced by  Anna Blinkova
  Markéta Vondroušová → replaced by  Alizé Cornet
  Wang Qiang → replaced by  Varvara Gracheva

During the tournament
  Bianca Andreescu (abdominal injury)

Retirements
  Alizé Cornet
  Océane Dodin
  Harmony Tan
  Jil Teichmann

Doubles main-draw entrants

Seeds 

 1 Rankings as of 17 May 2021.

Other entrants 
The following pairs received wildcards into the doubles main draw:
  Clara Burel /  Diane Parry
  Estelle Cascino /  Jessika Ponchet

The following pair received entry using a protected ranking:
  Alexandra Panova /  Julia Wachaczyk

Withdrawals 
Before the tournament
  Shuko Aoyama /  Ena Shibahara → replaced by  Miyu Kato /  Renata Voráčová
  Anna Blinkova /  Lyudmyla Kichenok → replaced by  Anna Blinkova /  Christina McHale
  Nadiia Kichenok /  Raluca Olaru → replaced by  Ekaterina Alexandrova /  Yana Sizikova
  Alla Kudryavtseva /  Alexandra Panova → replaced by  Alexandra Panova /  Julia Wachaczyk
  Nicole Melichar /  Demi Schuurs → replaced by  Vivian Heisen /  Nicole Melichar

References

 Official website

2021 WTA Tour
2021
2021 in French tennis
May 2021 sports events in France